Chaim Abraham Gagin  (1787–1848) was Chief Rabbi of Ottoman Palestine from 1842 to 1848.

He was the grandson of the Jerusalem Kabbalist Shalom Sharabi.  He was author of Sepher Hatakanoth Vehaskamoth, a compendium of Jewish religious rites and customs as practiced in the City of Jerusalem.

References

19th-century rabbis from the Ottoman Empire
Rabbis from Istanbul
1787 births
1848 deaths
Sephardi rabbis in Ottoman Palestine